The Pan Continental Curling Championships are an annual curling tournament, held every year in late October or early November. The event is used to qualify teams from the America and Pacific-Asia zones for the World Curling Championships, with the top five teams from the A division earning qualification. The championship was created to combine the Pacific-Asia Curling Championships and the Americas Challenge into one event, and create a stronger continental competition to mirror the established European Curling Championships.

Summary

Men

Women

Medal summary

Overall
As of 2022

Men
As of 2022

Women
As of 2022

References

 
International curling competitions
International sports championships in the Americas
Curling competitions in Canada
Curling
Oceanian championships
Recurring sporting events established in 2022